Sagavoll folkehøgskole, Sagavoll Folk High School, is a Christian folk high school in Norway. It is situated in Gvarv, a small town in the municipality of Sauherad in the county of Telemark. The school was founded in 1893 in Notodden by Asbjørn Knutsen, but later moved to its current location in Gvarv. 
It is an independent foundation, and is run by a board consisting of representatives from KRIK, Normisjon and KFUK-KFUM (the Norwegian YMCA/YWCA).

Subjects
Sagavoll offers one-year courses in nine different classes. These are:
Dance,
The Outdoors, Bible and Initiativ,
The Outdoors,
Outdoor Activity Extreme,
Intercultural Focus,
KRIK - Sport and Bible,
KRIK - Volleyball and Skiing,
Music, and
Textile, Clothes and Interior design.

In addition to these subjects, students can also choose from around 100 different modules, which are subjects the students can choose from outside what would be their typical class-related subjects.

Boarding
The school has boarding for 130 students. They live in the various boarding houses on campus where they have either one-person or two-person rooms. The houses are two-story buildings (with the exception of Tunheim having only one, and Sagaheim having three), each floor housing either only males or only females. Occupants of a floor share a livingroom, showers and lavatory facilities.

The Houses
Tunheim (one-story)
Granheim
Furuheim
Bjørkheim
Sagaheim (Three-story)

References

External links
Sagavoll Folkehøgskole Homepage
Information about Folk High Schools in Norway
Sauherad Kommune

Telemark
Boarding schools in Norway
Educational institutions established in 1893
Folk high schools in Norway
1893 establishments in Norway